Monroe County Community College (MCCC) is a public community college in Monroe County in the U.S. state of Michigan.  The main campus is located in Monroe Charter Township with a smaller off-campus location further south in Temperance.

MCCC was founded in 1964 and is the only higher education institution in the county.  The college was established in 1964. Classes were initially held at the Ida Public Schools in the fall of 1965.  Classes were first held at the main campus in the fall of 1967.

MCCC offers a general education program for students seeking transfer to a four-year university or those seeking a career in a vocational education.  The college has a highly regarded and selective nursing school.  The highest degree that one can achieve solely through MCCC is an associate degree.  Nearby universities, such as Eastern Michigan University and Siena Heights University, offer some of their undergraduate courses at Monroe County Community College so students can earn a bachelor's degree without ever leaving MCCC's campus.  MCCC also has a Formula SAE chapter, a student operated newspaper (Agora), and programs available in distance learning, courses on video, and online courses. The college has no sports teams, but they do offer intramural courses in many sports and physical health classes.

Campus
The main campus was built in 1967 just west of Monroe, Michigan in Monroe Charter Township near the River Raisin.  It is centrally located within Monroe County, and a number of major roadways provide easy access for students.  There are seven classroom buildings on the campus, and the campus is continually expanding to meet the needs of a growing number of college students, especially for parking.  The property of the main campus is 274 acres (110.88 ha).  The newest buildings are the Health Building (1996) and the La-Z-Boy Center (2006) — the latter of which was so named since the La-Z-Boy company, whose headquarters are located in Monroe, donated money for the construction of the new building.  Each of the buildings on the main campus are commonly referred to by a letter abbreviation.

In 1991, MCCC built the Whitman Center about 15 miles (24 km) south in Temperance, Bedford Township to better serve the growing population in the southern portion of the county, as well as providing a closer facility for those in Toledo, Ohio.  The Whitman Center offers the same services as the main campus, such as offices and a bookstore, but with limited space and class offerings since the complex consists of only one building with eight classrooms and one computer lab.  The complex was named after a nearby Ford dealership, Whitman Ford, which donated money for its construction.

References

External links

Official website

Buildings and structures in Monroe County, Michigan
Education in Monroe County, Michigan
Community colleges in Michigan
Two-year colleges in the United States
Educational institutions established in 1964
1964 establishments in Michigan